The 1962 Georgia Tech Yellow Jackets football team represented the Georgia Institute of Technology during the 1962 NCAA University Division football season. The Yellow Jackets were led by 18th-year head coach Bobby Dodd, and played their home games at the newly expanded Grant Field in Atlanta.

On November 17, 1962, Georgia Tech pulled off a huge upset over defending national champions Alabama, ending their 27-game undefeated streak. The Yellow Jackets stopped a go-ahead two point conversion from Alabama and then intercepted a pass from Joe Namath deep in Georgia Tech territory late in the fourth quarter to seal the deal. Georgia Tech finished the regular season fourth in the Southeastern Conference, with a 7–2–1 overall record and ranked 11th in the final Coaches' Poll. They were invited to the 1962 Bluebonnet Bowl, where they lost to Missouri.

Schedule

Source:

References

Georgia Tech
Georgia Tech Yellow Jackets football seasons
Georgia Tech Yellow Jackets football